Daphnella retusa is a species of sea snail, a marine gastropod mollusk in the family Raphitomidae.

Description
The length of the shell attains 6 mm.

Distribution
This species occurs in the Pacific Ocean off Panama.

References

 MacLean, J.H. & Poorman, R. (1971) New species of tropical Eastern Pacific Turridae. The Veliger, 14, 89–113

External links
 
 Gastropods.com: Daphnella retusa

retusa
Gastropods described in 1971